The 1935 World Table Tennis Championships men's doubles was the ninth edition of the men's doubles championship.
Miklós Szabados and Viktor Barna defeated Alfred Liebster and Adrian Haydon in the final by three sets to nil. Barna won his seventh consecutive doubles title and Szabados his sixth from the last seven.

Results

See also
List of World Table Tennis Championships medalists

References

-